Sky People may refer to:

 "Sky People", a 1985 rock song
Sky people, Earthlings' names for immigrants from The Ark, on The 100 TV series
 The Sky People, a 1959 science-fiction novel in the Maurai series by Poul Anderson
 The Sky People, a 2006 science-fiction novel by S. M. Stirling

See also
Men of the Sky (disambiguation)
"People of the Sky"